Lady Shri Ram College for Women (LSR) is a constituent women's college, affiliated with the University of Delhi, and has a legacy in women's education.

History 
Established in 1956 in New Delhi by the late Lala Shri Ram in memory of his wife Phoolan Devi (Lady Shri Ram), the college began in a school building in Daryaganj, Central Delhi with 299 students, nine faculty, and four support staff. The college is now located in a  campus in Lajpat Nagar in South Delhi.

LSR's infrastructure includes a library with internet access, 1200 books, 50 online journals and 12798 in-house journals and periodicals. Its Board of Governors is chaired by industrialist and philanthropist Bharat Ram. The new principal of the college is Ms. Suman Sharma.

Mission 
The stated mission of Lady Shri Ram College for Women is to:
(i)Empower women to assume leadership roles in a globalised, rapidly changing, technology-based nation and world. 
(ii) Encourage long-term, future-based, solution-oriented innovative thinking.
(iii)Emphasize the power of collaboration, harmony and conflict resolution in the attainment of goals.
(iv) Promote ethics, human values and compassion in young minds.
(v) Develop critical thinkers and responsive citizens who engage with social, political, economic issues and seek to make a change for the better.
(vi) Sustain democratic spaces for creative explorations of young women’ skills, aptitudes and talents
(vii) Contribute new perspectives to the world of knowledge in the pursuit of gender-based and other forms of social justice.
(viii) Enhance access and inclusivity in higher education, including digital access.
(ix) Provide a wholistic context of learning that encourages young women to aspire for success and to take setbacks as significant learning experiences.

Academics

Academic programmes 
Within the constraints of prescribed syllabi, LSR attempts to offer an eclectic selection, a range of options for students.
B.A. (H): Economics,  English, Hindi, History, Philosophy, Political Science, Sanskrit, Sociology, Psychology
B.Com. (H)
B.A. Programme 
BSc. (H): Mathematics, Statistics
B.El.Ed
Postgraduate Diploma in  Conflict Transformation and Peace-building (CTPB)
Journalism and Mass Communication (H)

Rankings

LSR College ranked first by leading publications and second among colleges in India by the National Institutional Ranking Framework (NIRF) in 2020.

Student life

Cultural festivals 
Tarang is the annual cultural festival of Lady Shri Ram College. Tarang is known for bringing together the best student talent from across the country in fields of music, dance, dramatics, debating, fine arts, quiz, and film.

Student clubs
LSR also has 20 other clubs for extra-curricular activities such as Hive for art enthusiasts, a Debating Society for debates, and Dramatics Society for drama. Other clubs include the LSR's choreography group, the Western Music Society and the classical music society. In addition to this, there is also compulsory enrollment in National Service Scheme, National Sports Organisation or National Cadet Corps.

LSR is committed to creating a generation of young individuals who take an active interest in the development of their society and communities. Various extension activities are thus conducted in LSR through multiple platforms such as NSS, NCC, NSO, REACH and ENACTUS. .

Notable alumni

 Sanjana Sanghi, Bollywood actress 
 Aditi Rao Hydari, Bollywood actress
 Priyamvada Kant, Actress
 Anasuya Sengupta, Senior Director of Grantmaking, Wikimedia Foundation
 Tillotama Shome, Actress
 Anjali Gopalan, honoured with Chevalier de la Legion d'Honneur; founder of Naz Foundation (India) Trust
 Anshula Kant, Chief Financial Officer and Managing Director, The World Bank
 Anupriya Patel, Member of Parliament and Former Minister of State for Health and Family Welfare
 Archana Puran Singh, television host, Bollywood actress, anchor and celebrity judge
 Aung San Suu Kyi, pro-democracy activist and leader of the National League for Democracy in Burma; Nobel Peace Prize laureate
 Baisali Mohanty, classical dancer and choreographer; columnist
 Chitra Subramaniam, India's first woman investigative journalist
 Chhavi Rajawat, Sarpanch of village Soda
 Deepa Mehta, filmmaker 
 Divya Dwivedi, philosopher 
 Gauri Khan, film producer, interior designer
 Geeta Luthra, Senior Advocate
 Geetanjali Shree, acclaimed Hindi writer and International Booker Prize winner
 Gita Mittal, Hon’ble Chief Justice (Retd.), Jammu & Kashmir and Ladakh High Court
 Gita Gopinath, Chief Economist, International Monetary Fund
 Gurmehar Kaur, Young Activist, Writer, Leader
 Indu Malhotra, Judge, Supreme Court of India
 Jaishree Misra, popular fiction author
 Jasmine Kaur Roy, filmmaker
 Kiran Walia, Politician, Former Minister of Health and Family Welfare Department, Women & Child Development and Languages, Delhi Government.
 Maneka Sanjay Gandhi, MP, Former Minister of Women and Child Development, animal rights activist, and environmentalist
 Meenakshi Gopinath, educationist, former principal and Padma Shri awardee
 Meenakshi Reddy Madhavan, author
 Mridula Mukherjee, Director, Nehru Memorial Museum and Library, Delhi.
 Naina Lal Kidwai, Chief Executive Officer, HSBC India
 Nabila Jamshed, author
 Nidhi Razdan, Anchor - NDTV
 Niharika Acharya, editorial director, National Journal
 Pariva Pranati, popular TV actress
 Poile Sengupta, writer
 Prajna Paramita, Diplomat from the Indian Foreign Service; the first girl from Lady Shri Ram College to win the Rector's Prize for the Best Undergraduate in Delhi University (1970)
 Priya Prakash, businesswoman 
 Preeti Saran, Diplomat from the Indian Foreign Service
 Raashi Khanna, Indian actress
 Rasika Dugal, Indian film actress
 Sakshi Tanwar, television actress
 Sandhya Mridul, Indian actress
 Sayani Gupta, Indian film actress
 Shikha Sharma, CEO Axis Bank India 
 Shriya Saran, Indian film actress
 Sujatha Singh, former Indian Foreign Secretary
 Uma Sharma, Kathak dancer
 Usha Thorat, Former Deputy Governor, Reserve Bank of India
 Vinita Bali, Managing Director, Britannia Industries
 Sunita Kohli, Interior Designer who restored Rashtrapati Bhawan
 Vasundhara Sirnate, Indian political scientist and journalist.
 Kavita Singh, Professor and Infosys Prize winner
 Anjana Sinha, IPS officer
Parampara Tandon, music composer, singer
 Namgay Zam, Bhutanese journalist

See also
 St. Stephen's College, Delhi
 Hans Raj College, Delhi
 Shri Ram College of Commerce, Delhi
 Miranda House, University of Delhi, Delhi
 Loyola College, Chennai, University of Madras
 Narsee Monjee College of Commerce and Economics, Mumbai
 St. Xavier's College, Mumbai, University of Mumbai, Mumbai
 Education in India
 List of institutions of higher education in Delhi
 Kirori Mal College

References

External links 
 

Educational institutions established in 1956
Delhi University
Women's universities and colleges in Delhi
1956 establishments in Delhi